The rivière aux Écorces North-East is a tributary of the rivière aux Écorces, flowing in the unorganized territories of Lac-Jacques-Cartier, the La Côte-de-Beaupré Regional County Municipality, in the administrative region of Capitale-Nationale, in the province of Quebec, Canada. The course of the rivière aux Écorces North-East crosses the western part of the Laurentides Wildlife Reserve.

The valley of the rivière aux Écorces Nord-Est is served indirectly by the route 169 and directly by the forest road R0261 which goes up the valley of the rivière aux Écorces and the Rivière aux Écorces Nord-East. This valley is also served by some secondary forest roads, especially for forestry and recreational tourism activities.

Forestry is the main economic activity in this valley; recreational tourism, second.

The surface of the rivière aux Écorces North-East is usually frozen from the beginning of December to the end of March, however the safe circulation on the ice is generally made from mid-December to mid-March.

Geography 
The main watersheds neighboring the rivière aux Écorces North-East are:
 north side: rivière aux Écorces, Trompeuse River, Cloutier stream, Fortin stream, rivière aux Canots, Portage stream, Madeleine stream;
 east side: Pikauba River, Pikauba Lake, Talbot Lake, Black stream;
 south side: rivière aux Écorces du Milieu, Frenette Lake, Saint-Georges Lake, Germain Lake, Jacqueline Lake;
 west side: rivière aux Écorces, Corneillier Lake, Métascouac Lake.

The rivière aux Écorces North-East has its source at Petit lac Vézina in the forest zone in the Laurentides Wildlife Reserve. This source is located at:
  north of Honorine Lake;
  east of Jacqueline Lake;
  south-west of route 175;
  north-west of Jacques-Cartier Lake;
  south of the junction of route 169 and route 175;
  south-east of the summit of the hamlet Mont-Apica;
  east of the confluence of the Rivière aux Écorces North-East and the rivière aux Écorces.

Upper course of the Rivière aux Écorces Nort-East (segment of )

  towards the northeast by meandering, until the outlet (coming from the southeast) of Jacqueline Lake;
  to the west, forming a curve towards the north, up to the outlet (coming from the south) of Lac aux Loups;
  north-west across rapids, to Madeleine stream (coming from the north-east);
  towards the south-west crossing three series of rapids and curving towards the north-west, up to Delphis stream (coming from the south);
  towards the northwest by forming a loop towards the east in the middle of the segment and another towards the south at the end of the segment, up to the Portage stream (coming from the north);

Intermediate course of the Rivière aux Écorces North-East (segment of )
  south passing between two mountains, to Joyal stream (coming from the south);
  north-west curving west, to a bend in the river;
  towards the southwest, curving towards the west, collecting the outlet (coming from the southwest) from lac Gineau and the Martel stream (coming from the south) to the outlet (coming from the north) from Lac Duchâtelets;
  south-west, to the outlet (coming from the north) of lakes Charland, Joibert, Maher and Dupin;
  towards the south by forming a curve towards the west, by collecting the discharge (coming from the west) of the Paul-Eugène lake, by collecting the brook Kane (coming from the east ) and crossing Lake Rancourt for a hundred meters, to its mouth. Note: this lake is fed by the outlet of lakes Saint-Georges and Sayer. A marsh area characterizes the entire northern area of this lake;

Lower reaches of the North East Bark River (segment of )

  south-west in a deep valley, forming a large curve towards the north to go around a mountain whose summit reaches  and crossing several rapids, to a stream (coming from the east);
  towards the northwest by crossing some rapids and bending towards the west at the end of the segment, until its mouth.

The northeastern rivière aux Écorces North-East flows on the northeast bank of the rivière aux Écorces. This confluence is located at:
  east of Métascouac Lake;
  south-east of lac aux Écorces;
  north-west of the mouth of the rivière aux Écorces du Milieu;
  southwest of the junction of rout 169;
  east of the Canadian National railway;
  south-east of the confluence of the Pikauba River and the rivière aux Écorces;
  south-east of the confluence of the Pikauba River and Kenogami Lake;
  southwest of the confluence of the Chicoutimi River and the Saguenay River in the Chicoutimi sector of the town of Saguenay (city).

Toponymy 
The toponym “Rivière aux Écorces Nord-Est” was formalized on December 5, 1968, at the Place Names Bank of the Commission de toponymie du Québec.

See also 
 List of rivers of Quebec

References 

Rivers of Capitale-Nationale
La Côte-de-Beaupré Regional County Municipality
Laurentides Wildlife Reserve